The Protective Security Command (ProCom) is a specialist counter-terrorist police unit of the Singapore Police Force (SPF). ProCom was formed to build up Singapore Police Force's public security capabilities and project police presence at security-sensitive locations. On 8 July 2016, the unit was commissioned.

An evolving public security landscape and the changing demographics of Singapore created the impetus for the transformation of the Key Installations Command (KINS), which was once part of the Police National Service Department (PNSD), into ProCom, a stand-alone specialist line unit involved in Singapore Police Force's fight against terrorism. The unit has the largest group of Full-time National Servicemen (NSFs) and Operationally Ready National Servicemen (NSmen) in the Singapore Police Force.

History
On 8 July 2016, ProCom was formed to protect security sensitive locations and to provide security coverage at key national events such as the annual National Day Parade.

On 1 December 2017, In-Situ Reaction Teams (IRTs) were formed as an elite unit within the command to complement existing Ground Response Force teams and Emergency Response Teams (ERTs) as a "Wave 0" response to terror attacks. They are deployed in popular areas across Singapore such as Orchard Road and Marina Bay.

In July 2020, ProCom officers were deployed to ensure the safety of voters at polling centres island-wide during the 2020 Singaporean general elections.

Manpower & equipment
ProCom draws its manpower from regular police officers, as well as conscripted Full-Time National Servicemen (NSF) resources. All officers are trained to use the Heckler & Koch MP5 sub-machine gun as well as the M4 carbine, in addition to the force-wide standard Taurus Model 85 revolver, though Taurus revolver was phased out for Glock 19 to be used as force-wide handgun.

Operations
ProCom officers currently operate in groups of at least 4 officers and are deployed across the island. They cover five main duties: Strategic Location Protection (SLP), In-Situ Reaction Teams (IRT), Event Security (ES), and Protection of Installations (POI).

References

Counterterrorism in Singapore
Singapore Police Force